Kondovo may refer to :

Kondovo, Bulgaria,  a village in the municipality of Ivaylovgrad, southern Bulgaria
Kondovo, Saraj, a village in the Saraj Municipality of Skopje, North Macedonia